Charles Lahr (27 July 1885 – 1971), born Carl Lahr, was a German-born anarchist, London bookseller and publisher.

Lahr was born at Bad Nauheim in the Rhineland, the eldest of 15 children in a farming family. He left Germany in 1905 to avoid military service and went to London, England where he lived until his death in 1971.

In London he encountered the anarchist Guy Aldred (1886–1963), while working as a baker. He was soon (1907) under police observation. He joined the Industrial Workers of the World in 1914; at that time he had a bookshop in Hammersmith.

In 1915 he was interned for four years as an enemy alien in Alexandra Palace. In 1920-22 he was briefly a member of the Communist Party of Great Britain; he was excluded from membership in October 1922 on the grounds of 'political unreliability'. His interest in politics led him to befriend many left-wing thinkers, several of whom went on to establish important left-wing groups in the UK. In 1921 he took over the Progressive Bookshop, in Red Lion Street, Holborn. From there he would branch out into publishing, and establish many literary friendships (including H. E. Bates, Rhys Davies, T. F. Powys) and  D. H. Lawrence. At one point when Lahr was in financial difficulties his writer friends gathered a collection of stories together and published these as Charles Wain (1933).

He married in 1922 Esther Argeband, (at that time Archer), whom he had met at the Charlotte Street Socialist Club. She was a Jewish factory worker from East London. They were close friends of William Roberts, the artist, and his wife, and William's portrait of Esther is in the Tate Gallery.

From 1925 to 1927 Lahr published The New Coterie literary and artistic magazine. In 1931 he founded the Blue Moon Press, a small press; amongst the books he published was the first edition of a small book of poems by D. H. Lawrence called Pansies.
 
In subsequent misfortunes Lahr was convicted in 1935 on a charge of receiving stolen books, and was sentenced to 6 months in prison. He was interned again in the Second World War. Lahr believed the internments was based on his German background and anarchist beliefs.

In a short story from Something Short and Sweet (published 1937), H. E. Bates describes the court case with Lahr called "Oscar" in the story. The bookshop was bombed in 1941. He moved its premises several times in London.

He died in London in 1971. His funeral was attended by many representatives from left wing groups in the UK. His granddaughter is Esther Leslie.

Lahr's papers are held by the University of London.

Notes

External links
Catalogue of Lahr's papers at the University of London
Sheila Lahr, Yealm

1885 births
1971 deaths
Industrial Workers of the World members
German emigrants to England
People from Bad Nauheim
German anarchists
German booksellers
British anarchists
British booksellers
People from the Grand Duchy of Hesse
20th-century British businesspeople